Narosa fletcheri is a moth of the family Limacodidae first described by West in 1937. It is found in Sri Lanka.

References

Moths of Asia
Moths described in 1937
Limacodidae